Andabalis was a town of ancient Cataonia or of southern Cappadocia located northeast of Tyana. It was inhabited during Roman and Byzantine times.

Its site is located near Eski Andaval, Asiatic Turkey.

References

Populated places in ancient Cappadocia
Populated places in ancient Cataonia
Former populated places in Turkey
Roman towns and cities in Turkey
Populated places of the Byzantine Empire
History of Niğde Province